Marja Auroma (born 29 July 1949) is a Finnish cross-country skier. She competed in two events at the 1980 Winter Olympics.

Cross-country skiing results

Olympic Games

World Championships

World Cup

Season standings

References

External links
 

1949 births
Living people
Finnish female cross-country skiers
Olympic cross-country skiers of Finland
Cross-country skiers at the 1980 Winter Olympics
People from Mikkeli
Sportspeople from South Savo
20th-century Finnish women